Sarpavaram is a commercial area of  Kakinada City in East Godavari District of Andhra Pradesh State.

References

Villages in East Godavari district